Belle Vue Park may refer to any of the following:

United Kingdom
Belle Vue Park, park in Newport, Wales
Belle Vue Park (Stockton-on-Tees), former greyhound racing stadium in Stockton-on-Tees, England
Belle Vue Park (Lowestoft), site of a Royal Naval Patrol Service memorial in Lowestoft, England

See also
Belle Vue (disambiguation)
Bellevue State Park (disambiguation)
Bellevue Park (disambiguation)
Bellevue (disambiguation)